Kelly Kelly is an American television sitcom created by David Kendall, starring Shelley Long and Robert Hays, that aired on The WB from April 20 to June 7, 1998.

Plot
Kelly Novak is an Ivy League English literature professor who meets widowed fire chief Doug Kelly. The two get married and she becomes Kelly Kelly. They live together in his Secaucus, New Jersey, house with his three sons and one daughter.

Cast
Shelley Long as English professor Kelly Novak.
Robert Hays as widowed firefighter Doug Kelly.
Ashley Johnson as 13-year-old Maureen Kelly.
Will Estes as 17-year-old Sean Kelly.
Bug Hall as middle son Brian Kelly.
Gemini Barnett as 6-year-old Casey Kelly.

Production
Columbia TriStar Television had originally developed the series, and produced a pilot, before handing over production of the show to Warner Bros. Television. During filming of the first episode, Shelley Long broke a finger while catching a football.

Episodes
After airing two episodes to low ratings, The WB moved the series from Mondays to Sundays. Seven episodes are registered with the United States Copyright Office.

Reception
Howard Rosenberg of the Los Angeles Times called the series "routine sitcomdom" with "some occasional bright dialogue". John Carman of the San Francisco Chronicle was also unimpressed, and thought the show was "almost an exact copy of It Had to Be You", which lasted a month. Matthew Gilbert of The Boston Globe said the series was "neither horrible nor promising, just kind of generic and bland". David Bianculli of the Daily News rated the series one and a half stars, and called the scripts "painfully predictable and not even sporadically amusing". Kevin D. Thompson of The Palm Beach Post also rated the series one and a half stars saying that the show is "a bland family comedy we've seen too many times before". Elaine Liner of the Boston Herald gave the series no stars, as well as grading it "an F as a two-alarm failure".

References

External links

1990s American sitcoms
1998 American television series debuts
1998 American television series endings
English-language television shows
Television series by Warner Bros. Television Studios
The WB original programming
Television shows set in New Jersey